The A49 derby is a football rivalry between Hereford F.C. (and before its demise, Hereford United) and Shrewsbury Town.

The derby was listed as the nineteenth fiercest rivalry in English football by The Daily Telegraph, with the two clubs last facing each other in the league during the 2011–12 season which concluded with Shrewsbury being promoted to League One and Hereford relegated to the Conference National. The last meeting to date was an FA Cup first-round tie the following season at Edgar Street, with Hereford winning 3–1.

Hereford United were subsequently wound-up at the High Court in December 2014. With the phoenix club Hereford F.C. currently competing in the National League North, three divisions below Shrewsbury, the fixture is only likely to be played in the FA Cup.

In November 2015, an FA Vase second round fixture between the newly formed Hereford F.C. and Shrewsbury-based West Midlands (Regional) League club Haughmond at Edgar Street was humorously given the title of "The New A49 Derby".

History

Head-to-head record

Results

Crossing the Divide
Graham Turner has managed both clubs on two separate occasions. He began his managerial career at Shrewsbury in 1978, remaining there until 1984. After spells with Aston Villa and Wolverhampton Wanderers he was named manager of Hereford in 1995, remaining there until 2009. Another spell at Hereford followed in 2010 before his last managerial appointment to date at Shrewsbury between 2010 and 2014.

Players to have moved directly between the two clubs include:

 John Brough
 Nick Chadwick
 Howard Clark
 Scott Cooksey
 John Dungworth
 Ryan Esson
 Steve Guinan
 Johnny Halpin
 David Jenkins
 Lennel John-Lewis
 Carl Leonard
 Gary Leonard
 Steve Leslie
 Jon Narbett
 Ralph Oliver
 Marc Pugh
 Rob Purdie
 Ben Smith
 Mark Taylor
 Paul Tester
 Danny Thomas
 Andrew Tretton

References

External links
 Head to Head details at Soccerbase

England football derbies
Hereford F.C.
Hereford United F.C.
Shrewsbury Town F.C.